Starting Now may refer to:

 Starting Now (Chuck Wicks album), a 2008 country music album
 Starting Now (Toad the Wet Sprocket album), a 2021 rock album
 "Starting Now" (song), a 2021 single by Brandy